Benny Hahessy (born 1972) is an Irish retired Gaelic footballer who played as a left wing-forward for the Tipperary senior team.

Born in Carrick-on-Suir, County Tipperary, Hahessy first arrived on the inter-county scene at the age of sixteen when he first linked up with the Tipperary minor team before later joining the under-21 and junior sides. He joined the senior panel during the 1997 championship. Hahessy subsequently became a regular member of the starting fifteen and won one Tommy Murphy Cup medal.

At club level Hahessy played with Carricks Swans.

Hahessy retired from inter-county football following the conclusion of the 2005 championship.

Honours

Player

Tipperary
Tommy Murphy Cup (1): 2005
McGrath Cup (1): 2003

References

1972 births
Living people
Carrick Swans Gaelic footballers
Tipperary inter-county Gaelic footballers